, known as the , is a fictional character in the Soulcalibur series of historical fantasy fighting games by Namco. Taki is a Japanese demon-hunting kunoichi and the greatest warrior of the Fu-Ma ninja clan, who is traveling the world on a quest to destroy the powerful swords known as Soul Edge and Soul Calibur.

Taki has been introduced in the original arcade version of Soul Edge in 1995 as one of the main characters along with her friend Sophitia. Taki has been featured as a player character in every main entry in the series up until 2012's Soulcalibur V, when her place was taken by her own young disciple named Natsu, but returned in 2018's Soulcalibur VI. She has further appeared in all of Soulcalibur spin-off games, as well as in some other titles such as Namco × Capcom and Queen's Gate.

She has been voiced in Japanese by Fujiko Takimoto until Soulcalibur III, and then by Sachiko Kojima in later games, while her English voice actors included Desirée Goyette. In terms of gameplay, Taki is most capable at close quarters fighting where her speed, acrobatic agility and powerful kicks are the most effective.

Taki has achieved a significant popularity among the fans of the series, especially in the West. She has received mostly positive feedback, often having been for noted her iconic status in the Soul series and regarded as one of the best female ninja characters in video games as well as one of sex symbols of the fighting genre and gaming in general, sometimes being compared in these aspects to the likes of Mai Shiranui and the ninja women from Mortal Kombat.

Appearances

Soul games
In her backstory, Taki has been raised by the Fu-Ma, a Sengoku-era mystic ninja clan based in a hidden village in Ōmi Province and connected to the Buddhist monk Tenkai, having had been adopted by them after her parents and brother died from disease. As a prodigy member of the Fu-Ma, specializing in forging anti-demon equipment and in combating harmful yōkai spirits, Taki became a very serious and stern fighter, regarded as most skilled in the entire clan, as well as an accomplished spy and blacksmith, known for not showing her personal feelings, carrying out her mission cool-headed, and being capable of making ruthless decisions. She eventually tasks herself with destroying both the cursed Soul Edge and the blessed Soul Calibur, and is not going to show mercy to anyone representing an obstacle.

Taki debuted as one of the eight original characters in Soul Edge (1995), set in the year 1584. In it, the 22-year-old Taki has dedicated herself to fighting supernatural evil and began travelling Japan to purge with her sealing magic. When her self-made magical blade Rekkimaru has been weakened by the legendary mighty evil sword known as Soul Edge, she decides to travel west to find and destroy it. The prologue of Soulcalibur (1998) tells of how at the end of Soul Edge she has confronted and defeated the game's main villain and Soul Edge's wielder, Cervantes de Leon, and obtained a fragment of the shattered sword. During that fight, Taki also saved the wounded Greek female warrior Sophitia Alexandra, who became her friend. Taki tried to merge the Soul Edge fragment with Rekkimaru without success, but when she fuses it with her other sword, Mekkimaru, she creates a new evil weapon that she seeks to pit against Soul Edge, hoping both blades would then destroy each other. However, Fu-Ma's former leader, Hachibei, steals Mekkimaru and flees, becoming a fugitive nukenin (runaway ninja). Taki's old master and adoptive father, Toki orders her to hunt down and kill Hachibei and his daughter Chie, a childhood friend of Taki, and bring back the blade. Taki locates Hachibei, but, learning about Toki's obsession with the blade, she gives a false report to Toki, leading his forces to pursue Chie's lover Li Long as a decoy. When Geki, Toki's right-hand man, discovers her deception, Taki becomes a nukenin outcast herself, carrying Mekkimaru and evading pursuers. Soulcalibur Legends (2007), which retells the events that take between Soul Edge and Soulcalibur, pits Taki, searching for the scattered shards of the Soul Edge, against Geki and his female partner Maki, both of whom eventually transformed into monsters by Soul Edge's power.

Taki returns in the next sequel, Soulcalibur II (2002), set seven years after the events of Soul Edge. After hearing about the destruction of Soul Edge, she works to tame Mekkimaru, but discovers that Toki has obtained more Soul Edge fragments and decides to keep them away from him. In Soulcalibur III (2005), Taki comes back to Japan and learns that Toki's madness resulted in an internal conflict within the Fu-Ma. Contacting Chie's rebellious faction, Taki faces the corrupted Toki as he absorbs the oni spirits sealed within the Hoko temple. She slays him and Chie becomes the new Fu-Ma leader, but the evil spirits that dwelled within Toki escape and travel west. Knowing they are seeking Soul Edge, and that its power has weakened, Taki begins a new journey to find and finally extinguish the evil sword. In Soulcalibur IV (2008), witnessing a cataclysm caused by a duel between Siegfried armed with Soul Calibur and Soul Edge-wielding Nightmare motivates her to destroy both of the Soul swords.

Formerly, it has been announced that Taki would return in the sixth main installment, Soulcalibur V (2012) set 17 years after the events of the previous game, wherein she was supposed to appear alongside her young, female disciple named Natsu. However, Taki herself did not appear in the game in person. Soon after the events of Soulcalibur IV, she has sealed the demon Arahabaki inside Natsu, an orphan baby adopted by Chie, following Taki's slaying of his previous human host. Because this caused the girl to be ostracized by her peers, Taki took the responsibility to personally raise her so she may grow her confidence in herself. As explained in Natsu's backstory, Taki had traveled west to pursue rumors of Toki's return, promising that she would return in two weeks; she has not returned since, prompting the now-teenage Natsu to travel in search of her mentor. The game does not reveal whether Natsu finds her, but it was said that Taki would "eventually" return. Afterwards, has appeared as a playable character in the now-defunct free-to-play spin-offs Soulcalibur: Lost Swords (2014), where she looked by default as she did in Soulcalibur IV, and in Soulcalibur: Unbreakable Soul (2014), where she looked as she did in Soulcalibur II.

Her return as a playable character in the main series was first leaked and then officially announced for Soulcalibur VI (2018). The game is not set during or after the events of Soulcalibur V, however, but rather revisits and retells these of the original Soulcalibur.

Other appearances
Taki plays a lead role in the 1999 Soulcalibur manga series, in which she fights alongside Sophitia, first killing Cervantes and then destroying Nightmare. Taki has also joined the cast of the erotic franchise Queen's Blade, starring (in a cartoonish version of her default appearance from Soulcalibur IV) in her own gamebook, Queen's Gate Taki (神速の封刃 タキ), published in 2011. She is furthermore extensively featured in the collectible card game Universal Fighting System and in the series' 20th anniversary Soulcalibur pachislot machine.

Taki appears as a playable character in the 2005 crossover tactical role-playing game Namco × Capcom, where she represents the Soul universe along with Mitsurugi (considered her rival in the series). In this game, Taki is paired with Waya Hime (Bravoman) and teamed with fighting game icons Jin Kazama (Tekken) and Ryu (Street Fighter). Her default costume from Soulcalibur IV was made available as free downloadable content (DLC) for the player character Estelle in action role-playing game Tales of the World: Radiant Mythology in 2009, as well as for Sackgirl in puzzle platformer LittleBigPlanet 3 in 2016. Taki appears in The King of Fighters All Star in her Soulcalibur VI design.

In general merchandise, Namco released a Taki key chain figurine and a standing clock in its 1996 Soul Edge line, among other items such as window shades and table mats. Yujin released two 4 in (10 cm) immobile figurines of Taki in her primary outfit from Soulcalibur II as part of its gashapon figure collections 'Namco Girls' Series 1 and 4 (in her alternative costume based on Waya Hime's design), and Wave released a 1/8 scale 7.5 in (19 cm) garage kit figure of Taki from the same game in 2003. In 2006, Namco released a MegaHouse PVC statuette based upon promotional artwork of Taki for the game as part of a Soulcalibur III, set along with an alternative-color unmasked version with three interchangeable weapons for it to hold. Triad Toys released a 12 in (30 cm) action figure of Taki from Soulcalibur IV in red and blue versions in 2008. In 2007–2010, Futene Karada and Aya released two resin kits for Taki's appearances in her prime costumes in Soulcalibur III, 7 in (17 cm) (crouching) and 9.4 in (24 cm) (dashing), as well as an alternate version of the latter. A 19.5 inch (50 cm) high statue of Taki based on her appearance in Soulcalibur II was announced by First 4 Figures in 2017, along with an even larger version made exclusive for pre-orders only.

Design and characteristics 

At the height of 170 cm (5'7 feet), Taki has been the tallest female character in the first game until Ivy Valentine's debut in Soulcalibur. She has a chest size of 90 cm / E (Soulcalibur IV measurements; her breasts have noticeably grown through the series). Within the series' lore, her alignment is Neutral / Good; what "lies within her soul" (a character's defining concept) is honor. Taki has been officially described as "one of the most versatile fighters of the SOULCALIBUR universe" due to "her unarmed & armed skills, demon huntress abilities and blacksmithing abilities." Soulcalibur II producer Hiroaki Yotoriyama spoke of his team being "proud" of Ivy and Taki as "these characters seem to live [...] as if it is real and they are really human." Soulcalibur III director Katsutoshi Sasaki regarded Taki as his personal favorite character from the series and she was one of the first two returning characters confirmed for it.

As in the case of all Soul characters, Taki's character creation started with choosing the weapon. During the early development of Soul Edge, Taki was conceived as a Yoshimitsu-like ninja character, armed with a long sword and wearing a loose outfit and large helmet covering her upper face. She underwent several major design changes before the game's release, evolving into an athletic, iron-masked woman clad in a partially armored catsuit. Taki used variations of this outfit throughout the series; by default her primary costumes are colored crimson and sometimes navy blue, and usually she has long hair in a ponytail. Taki's outfits are generally supposed to give emphasis on ease of movement, due to her fighting style's emphasis on high leaping, tumbling and rolling. Her original weapon in Soul Edge is a kodachi, called , which she made by infusing it with mystical powers. This is her preferred weapon and is one of the few original weapons that have not been replaced in subsequent games. Her secondary weapon, the kodachi , formerly property of the deceased clan of the ninja Yoshimitsu (originally from Tekken), was added for her dual-wielding style in the first Soulcalibur as the lower blade on her back.

The later games' character design was based around the characters' movement so their look would match it, which in Taki's case included using two swords, moving very fast, and having a specialized kicking moveset. In some of her costumes she different hair styles, and in some has no mask at all. A simple cloth version of the mask has been introduced with Taki's primary costume in Soulcalibur (the only game in which her breasts are partially exposed). In some of her outfits, since Soulcalibur III, she has an ornate, demon-themed menpō armored half mask covering the face from the nose down to the chin but exposing the mouth; other demonic motifs have appeared on her armor since Soulcalibur. Taki alternate costumes include one in Soulcalibur II that was modeled after that of Waya Hime from Bravoman. One of her especially varied attires for Soulcalibur: Lost Swords has been the limited-offer "SC Woman" that was created by Bayonetta's character designer Mari Shimazaki, inspired by American comic books superheroines. According to Japanese culture researcher Rachael Hutchinson, "although Taki is sheathed in fabric, it is so tight that the shape of her body is clearly visible, making her the only female character with visible nipples and pubis. Taki is arguably the most sexualized of all the female characters [in the series] in this respect, although her costume is very strong and powerful where the costumes of Sophitia, Xianghua and Seung Mi-na are softer and more fluid." The game's producer Hisaharu Tago said of her appearance in Soulcalibur V, in which Taki is depicted as over 40, "In terms of her outfit, we don't know if she'll be in body tights." Taki retained her skintight clothing with noticeable nipples (a noted trait of the character and of the series) in Soulcalibur VI, which goes back to the series' early timeline.

Setsuka, introduced in Soulcalibur III, has a fighting style mixing these of Taki and Mitsurugi. Soulcalibur Vs Natsu fights very similar to her master Taki, including using many of her signature moves Immediately after the release of Soulcalibur V in Japan, the game's director Daishi Odashima said that he had decided that at 46, Taki would be too old to be an active ninja, and she retired to train the next generation and is now watching over Natsu from the shadows. In Namco's own 2016 fighting game Tekken 7: Fated Retribution, female ninja Master Raven is similar to Taki in many aspects, including her fighting technique, outfit and personality.

Gameplay 
According to Adam Rosenberg from UGO in 2008, "Taki is a close-range fighter, end of story. She's blindingly fast, perhaps one of the most agile fighters in the series. The best way to play Taki then is to string combo into combo without ever letting up. Official UK PlayStation Magazine recommended Taki and Li Long in Soul Edge as "probably best for the novice they can both offer a great range of kicks and attacks." Ultra Game Players noted her for speed and a variety of attacks, choosing her and Mitsurugi as the two most well-rounded characters in the game, and her alone as probably the best character, with "an attack for any given situation." She was noted for being very dangerous in unarmed combat (after losing weapons) too, due to her many and powerful kick moves. According to Computer and Video Games (CVG) guide to Soul Edge, "lightning fast combos and close quarter combat" is what a Taki player has to master in the game: "Though she has little in terms of long range attacks, she has multi-height combinations that can be employ in close. A good choice for the competent player to move on to." Similarly, James Price of DC-UK wrote that in Soulcalibur, the "fast and agile" Taki is capable of "swift and deadly attacks" as well as "of making somersaults over and around her opponents," but at the cost of having a limited range. According to Jesse Schedeen of IGN, the character's fighting style "improved dramatically" between Soul Edge and Soulcalibur due to being given dual swords to use at once. Taki has remained the quickest and most mobile character in Soulcalibur; as described by GameFan, "there is no character quicker and trickier (well, maybe Voldo has more tricks), than Taki. While her attacks don't do great damage, her quickness makes it easy to combo almost anything with her."

In Soulcalibur II, Taki was given more distance-closing moves to help compensate for her limited range. Nevertheless, the Soulcalibur II guide by GamePro verdicted Taki is an "excellent short range fighter with plenty of height variation in attack," yet still "weak against good long range opponents" and with "poor offensive capabilities outside short range." The game's review by Marlon Ramos of Philippine Daily Inquirer "of course" highly recommended Taki for the players who are "after speed". In GameSpot's guide to Soulcalibur II, Stephen Kleckner wrote that Taki has "a lot of options and variety which allow her to really mix up her attack heights" and very quick moves making her highly capable at close range, but might "essentially become a moving target" if her player "can't rush down someone who is really good at sustaining a range game, such as Kilik." Andrew Alfonso wrote in GameSpy's guide that "what makes Taki so fearsome is her speed. She's still the fastest character in the game, and despite this her damage potential is still very good at times. However, unlike the big power hitters like Cervantes and Astaroth, she needs to work for her wins." Alfonso added that Taki can be "somewhat hard to learn and execute with" and the key strategy "is to maintain her flow of attack." Taki and Talim, who are both the most acrobatic and fastest characters in the game, were noted to be particularly dangerous in the original version of the HD Online edition due to Internet multiplayer lag problems.

Taki has been one of the four characters available in the pre-release demo version of Soulcalibur IV. According to Alex Jenkins of 1UP.com, in this game Taki lost some of her prior advantages but is still an agile and fast character who can cause considerable damage and is meant to be played aggressively, as well as a strong counter-attacker. Her weaknesses include difficulties in playing against ranged-type characters and having many risky special moves. IGN's Schedeen wrote that, due to her "lightning-quick ninja reflexes," Taki is "a vicious combatant that new and old players alike love to control." According to the game's battle director, Taki is to be the fastest character of SCVI. In addition, her expanded magical possibilities are to make getting close to the enemy from a distance easier and her Rekkimaru to be able to hurt even to a blocking enemy.

In the action-adventure game Soulcalibur Legends, Taki is the only character capable of performing a double jump (a video game character's ability to jump a second time in mid-air). In the now-defunct online spin-off Lost Swords, she had been originally announced as one of the only four are available in this game from the start (the others being Siegfried, Mitsurugi and Sophitia) but was actually one of unlockable characters in the released version.

Reception

Popularity and general acclaim 
Since her introduction in 1995, Taki has been consistently one of the most popular characters in the Soul series, especially in the West, but also back home in Japan. For instance, Namco named Taki, Ivy and Nightmare as the three most popular Soulcalibur characters in North American markets in 2002. She was described as "a favorite of many" by Official Xbox Magazine (OXM), and as one of the series' most beloved characters by Brazil's SuperGamePower. UGO ranked Taki as sixth best Soulcalibur character in 2008. IGN's Schedeen ranked her as the series' fifth top fighter in 2008, writing "it's hard to imagine a Soulcalibur game without Taki. It just wouldn't be the same." GameDaily's staff called her one of the most elite fighters in the Soul games, adding that she "has left an impact from the very start" of the series; according to them, "there are many women worth mentioning in the Soul Calibur series, but if anyone really knows how to handle Darth Vader, Yoda and the Apprentice, it's Taki." X360 chose her as the most iconic character of Soulcalibur II, while Complex placed Taki sixth in their 2013 ranking of the best characters in the series, calling her "an unstoppable force" and stating "We love Taki!" She was voted the series' second (behind Talim) most popular character among the Western audience in an official Facebook poll by Namco Bandai in 2015, which was to influence their future plans for the franchise.

Some publications and authors have highly regarded Taki as one of the best female fighting game or even overall video game characters of them all for a variety of reasons. Reviewing Soulcalibur for the Dreamcast as the best fighting game he has ever played, Dave Halverson from Gamers' Republic wrote about being "elated" by its "work of art" character design of Taki, who "exhibits remarkable grace and agility, an almost spirit-like quality." SuperGamePower chose her one of the 20 "muses of video games" in 2001 and GMR 2003 feature "The GREAT Women of Gaming" included Taki at fourth place. In 2004, play called included her and her and Ivy among "gaming's greatest females", further calling them "arguably the finest females in all of 3D fighting." In 2007, Rob Wright of Tom's Games chose Taki as one of the 50 greatest female characters in video games, calling her "a skilled and noble warrior with a shining spirit and stunning beauty".

Sex appeal praise and criticism
The character has been often noted for her attractiveness, such as in the 2000 article "Console Miss World" by German magazine Video Games. Grant Howitt of FHM featured her as an example of "wonderful women of videogames", but one that would be hard to date. GameDaily highlighted her in many various entries of their "Babes of the Week" gallery series, including in the 2007 solo special "Babe of the Week: Taki", commenting that she has been "becoming more agile – and big-breasted – with each new entry." They further ranked her as 17th "hottest game babe" in 2008, citing "her muscular physique and insanely large chest." Rich Knight of Complex listed Taki as one of top ten "hottest game girls" in 2009, later matching her against Kitana from Mortal Kombat in the "battle of the beauties" in the category "female ninjas". In 2000, UGO listed Taki among the 50 "hottest girls" in video games and noted her as "quick, efficient, and super-deadly." In 2011, Bob Muir of Japanator.com described Taki as "easily the hottest one in the cast" of the series and included her on his list of Japanese gaming's top ten "hottest girls" for her "sexy" armor, "voluptuous body, including her generous chest," and "a dark humor to all of her taunts." In the "Miss of Video Games 2012" poll by Polish magazine PSX Extreme, Taki was voted second place in the 'Soul Calibur' category.

Many publications have, often positively, commented especially on her large bust and revealing clothing, in 1999 described in CVG as "a kinky little all-in-one red outfit and a pair of breasts to match Lara Croft's." As told by G4's Sherilynn Macale, "the girl's practically draped in skin-tight, nipple-proud and crevice-filling material that clings to her agile, dual kodachi wielding frame." Ben Richardson of GamesRadar commented: "Long time Soul Calibur battler Taki is a fanboy fave" due to how her "ninja suit has seemingly been designed for one thing. And that's making her love pillows resemble torpedoes [...] Namco really understands its fanbase." GameSpy in 2003 described her as "the bounciest ninja this side of Mai Shiranui" and later as "clearly modeled as though she is naked, but her clothes are just painted on to make it look like she's wearing a red bodysuit." In 2006, NGC Magazine gave her the 'Tightest Outfit' entry in their "Nintendo Book of Records" for her red catsuit from Soulcalibur II. GameDaily praised her "superb fashion sense" positively contrasted with Mileena from Mortal Kombat. Official PlayStation Magazine - Australia commented, "without complaining," on the "conspicuous enlargement" of Taki's chest in Soulcalibur IV. Michael McWhertor of Kotaku observed about this game: "Taki's boobs flopped about ridiculously with the slightest breeze it seemed, but that's not necessarily a complaint," and GamePro similarly noted her "assets bobbed and jiggled after each move" as an attraction for players. Ross Lincoln of GameFront included Taki on his 2011 list of "greatest boobs in video game history" and Joystiq's JC Fletcher called her "everyone's favorite underdressed ninja."

There has been, however, also much critical and sarcastic commentary in the regard of what Pat Garrat from Xbox World described as "blatant sexual references" of a "Japanese ninja with enormous tits. Sorry, there's no other way of saying it." Writing for GameSetWatch, Leigh Alexander used "Taki's nipples [that] have been meticulously articulated since the graphics technology existed to make it possible" as an example of "a strong degree of physical exploitation" of female characters in fighting games. According to Kotaku's McWhertor, Taki's "tighter than skin tight ninja outfit leav[es] absolutely nothing to the imagination, making her high kicks the stuff of Hustler magazine spreads." Destructoid's Karim Kayka commented on "ridiculously endowed ninja gal Taki, who demonstrates what happens now that consoles can chum out superflucous polygons to render realistic nipples under a skintight leotard." Shawn Sines of GameFront used an image of Taki from Soulcalibur II to illustrate the 2007 critical article about "the video game implementation of modeling female breasts." GamesRadar UK opined that Taki's breasts in Soulcalibur IV are "simply unfathomable and totally impractical for the fighting physique." GameDaily also repeatedly contrasted Taki's "inexplicably big" breasts and her "swift ninja moves," and asked "how does she fight with those big boobs." Similarly, Grant Howitt of FHM wondered about "how she kept those enormous breasts supported during fights," and GamesRadar's AJ Glasser commented Ivy's breasts are "a couple of cup sizes larger, but Taki probably has less back pain." Complexs Knight wrote that Taki's knowledge of mastery of ninjutsu and ninja magic that must be reason how she is able to do all her acrobatic moves with such a chest, adding that "most women with a cup size that big would have back pains and would have to sleep on their side at night" yet Taki "takes it all in stride, moving around the stage of history like the most athletic girl on the volleyball court." UGO commented: "To be honest we don't really care, but there must be some kind of ninja-magic that supports those behemoths." Writing in 2018, Kotaku's Cecilia D'Anastasio recalled how the first sight of Soulcalibur II's "objectified" Taki "in a skin-tight red suit [with] breasts jiggling everywhere," as well of Ivy, had personally troubled her for years, and criticized how Soulcalibur VI still followed the series' tradition of character design "in a different climate in games." Ian Dean from PlayStation Official Magazine – UK criticized as "eyesores" the outfits of Taki and Mi-Na in Soulcalibur VI for "pushing too much underboob and nipple front and centre."

Other reactions
WomenGamers.com opined Taki has been "a strong and independent female character in all of the games" and gave her an overall score of 8.4/10, especially applauding the character for her tough attitude and for marketing efforts towards women "despite the obvious sex-appeal role Taki has taken." Manila Bulletin review of Soulcalibur II advised readers to "not be fooled" by the looks of this "gorgeous ninja in a very tight-fitting outfit that leaves little to the imagination," as "Taki can kick anybody's b*tt and before they know it, it's already game over." Famitsu described her in this game as "a breathtaking sight to see, with more powerful offense and defense than the other girls in the game." According to Hutchinson's research, "when using Taki as her avatar, the player will be able to defeat more male opponents on screen, overturning social expectations of male–female roles."

Taki has been repeatedly listed as one of gaming's top ninja characters, such as by Kotaku in 2013. According to IGN's Schedeen, "Everyone loves a good ninja, and Taki just so happens to be one of the best." She was ranked as fifth best ninja hero in video games by Virgin Media in 2008. In 2010, Game Informer chose Taki as one of the 20 Namco characters they would like to see in a rumored crossover fighting game Namco Vs Capcom, her Capcom side equivalent being Strider Hiryu as "most fighting game characters can't quite keep up with Taki's rapid (and annoying) leaps." That same year, GamePro ranked her as the second best video game ninja character, comparing her with the similarly proportioned Mai for "her formidable pair of assets" and calling her "arguably the toughest and most skillful ninja" of them all. PSX Extreme compared her to Momiji and Gamers noted Kaede (Onimusha) to look "like Taki's twin sister." UGO included her on a 2010 list of top 25 "hot ninja girls" in all media and Gelo Gonzales of FHM included Taki on his 2012 list of nine "sexiest ninja babes" in games. In 2012, Rich Knight of Complex ranked her as the fifth swiftest video game ninja, adding that, due to her large bust size, "the only female on this list is also probably the most incredible ninja on here." In 2013, PLAY similarly ranked Taki as the fifth top ninja in video games, described as "superagile fighting machine" and noted as the only female on their list, adding that she "wins the Most Outrageous Ninja Outfit award for garbing herself in nothing but a pink skintight bodysuit." Márcio Alexsandro of Brazil's GameHall placed her at fifth spot of his 2014 list of top ten kunoichi (female ninja) characters in games.

Many fans and media outlets strongly criticized Taki's controversial replacement by her pupil Natsu in Soulcalibur V. In 2011, GamePro have stated it as one of the reasons why they were "worried" about the game. Reviewing the game, Daniel Bischoff of Game Revolution wrote "It's a cop-out to say that Taki is too old to fit in Soul Calibur V'''s timeline, and then flaunt Ivy and all of her overly abundant assets at the age of 50+. Why remove the characters at all if you're going to replace them with cardboard stand-ins?" Daniel Maniago of G4tv.com listed her among the characters that are "noticeably absent", Nick Dinicola of PopMatters listed her as first among the missing "fan favorite fighters", and Kotaku's Evan Narcisse described the replacement of Taki, Talim and Kilik as the developer's "most baffling decision". Following the game's release, the staff of IGN named Taki "the most obvious choice for the first DLC character" because her omission was "ridiculous". In an accompanying poll asking readers which character they would they choose to be added (including new characters from outside the series, such as Darth Maul), Taki placed third out of seven candidates. A review by Italy's The Games Machine called the game's roster "scandalous" and demanded to "bring back Taki!". Nevertheless, some other commentators approved of Taki's replacement; for instance, the preview by Taylor Cocke of OXM'' stated that "you'll be happy to know that newcomer Natsu is taking up [Taki's] mantle and then some."

See also

List of Soulcalibur characters 
Ninja in popular culture

Notes

References

Adoptee characters in video games
Fantasy video game characters
Female characters in anime and manga
Female characters in video games
Fictional people of Sengoku-period Japan
Fictional artists in video games
Fictional demon hunters
Fictional exorcists
Fictional female martial artists
Fictional female ninja
Fictional hunters in video games
Fictional Japanese people in video games
Fictional kenjutsuka
Fictional knife-fighters
Fictional martial arts trainers
Fictional Ninjutsu practitioners
Fictional secret agents and spies in video games
Fictional smiths
Fictional swordfighters in video games
Fictional taijutsuka
Namco protagonists
Ninja characters in video games
Orphan characters in video games
Role-playing video game characters
Soulcalibur series characters
Video game characters introduced in 1995
Video game characters who use magic
Video game characters with fire or heat abilities
Woman soldier and warrior characters in video games